Heeresnachrichtenamt (Army Intelligence Office) is an intelligence agency of the Austrian Armed Forces. Heeresnachrichtenamt researches information on military operations and projects abroad and conducts data analysis of gathered intelligence. The service maintains branch offices in Linz, Graz and Klagenfurt.

References

Military of Austria
Austrian intelligence agencies
Military intelligence agencies